Dara Utmankhel, also known as Shaikhan, is a valley in Lower Dir District, Pakistan. It consists of nine villages: Maniband ما نی بند, Jabaghi جبګۍ, Zara Doghy زړه  ډوګۍ, Kot Koshah  کوټ کو شاه, Mandal Korona   کورونه ماندل , Kot کوټ, Ghwandy غونډئ, Fazal Abad and Shah Kuronu شاه کو رونه. It lies in Timergara tehsil, east of the road from Timergara to Dir. The inhabitants of this area belong to the Mandal, a clan of Utmankhel. The Utmankhel is one of karlanri Pashtun or Afghan tribes, who appeared in concert with other tribes like Yousafzai and Tarkalani.They first settled in the area of Malakand, Bajaur and Mohmand Agency. These people were mainly associated with trade as the land was not suitable for agriculture.

History

Tor Baba 

Religion had a strong influence on the social spheres of these Afghan tribes, which led to the emergence of many religious families. Such families were able to exert influence not only on religious matters but on temporal affairs as well (e.g., the Akhund family in Swat and Dir). In the Utmankhel tribe, pious superstition also contributed to the creation of religious families such as Shaikhan.In reality, the Shaikhan living in Timergara are the descendants of Tor Baba or Abdur Rahim Khan (source, local elders). Abdur Rahim Khan was born in Bajaur and belonged to Mandal, a clan of the Utmankhel tribe. He migrated from Bajaur in the late seventeenth century and settled in Timergara. He was known as Tor Baba because of his piety.
Abdur Rahim Khan and Akhund Ilyas (d.1676 A.D) were disciples of Shaikh Adam Binori (cf. Mulana Habib Ahmad of Morany, Dir) and according to Muhammad Amin Badakhshi, most of Adam Binori's followers and khalifs were Afghans, which made Binori suspicious in the eyes of the Mughal officials and nobility. His shrine is located in the cemetery named after him. The residents of Jandol, Dir Khas, Maidan, Adenzai,  Swat District, Bajaur, and Malakand Agency used to visit the shrine, but the local clergy issued decrees declaring it "Bid'at" or forbidden in Islam. There are two other tombs in Moranay Lower Dir and Shagokas Lower Dir that bear the name of Tor Baba, and their descendants in the area have taken the same clan, Mandal (In Afghan genealogies, he is depicted as the elder son of Utman). According to Qazi Abdul Haleem Asar Afghani, the original name of Tor Baba in Moranay village was Muhammad Anwar Baig. It is possible that these three were brothers or belong to the same clan because Tor Baba and Akhund were used as religious titles at that time. For example, the father of Akhund Ilyas was also known as Tor Baba but no one knows his real name.

Descendants

Tor Baba had two sons, Mullah Baba and Islam Jan Baba, whose descendants live in the nearby nine villages. They are also known as Shaikhan, which does not correspond to their ethnicity, but is related to Abdur Rahim Khan, who received this title after becoming a follower of Shaikh Adam Binori .Sheikh, which literally means "elder". It is commonly used to refer to the leader of a tribe who received this title after his father, or an Islamic scholar who received this title after graduating from an Islamic elementary school (Madrasa). Akhund Khel and Shaikhan are different tribal communities in Pakistan and Afghanistan that are simply a "spiritual brotherhood" of unrelated followers of pious figures, e.g., Akhund Khel is a Pashtun tribe, but there is also Akhund Khel known as Sadat. Another group identifies itself as Sheikh Mohammadi, but there is no kinship connection.

In the 19th century (1895), Sher Khan's grandson, Zaer Mohammed, the friend and Salar of Umara Khan, who had protected Shamorgar Qela in Upper Dir, defeated Sharif Khan's invaders but was later arrested by Muhammad Sharif Khan.
The jirga system still exists, and most disputes are resolved by local elders.

Notable People 
Zaer Mohammad (Ally of Umara Khan, 1895)

Land area, people and economy 
This beautiful narrow valley is mountainous but slopes slowly and finally kiss Timergara Bazar. The 35-40% of the area of this valley is actually a Serai of Tor Baba, but later his descendants bought the rest of the area from Sadat and Ibrahim Khel (Yousafzai). The total population is about 2900 according to the 1998 census (estimate). The area has weak agriculture, so the main economy is based on the Middle East. The education rate is high among males. There are only five elementary schools and no middle or high schools.

References

 Lower Dir District